The University of Uyo Teaching Hospital (UUTH) is a tertiary hospital in Abak road, Uyo, Akwa Ibom State, an administrative division of Nigeria. The hospital started as the Akwa Ibom State Specialist Hospital, formed by the Akwa Ibom State Government in the year 1994 under the administration of Yakubu Bako. It was later renamed Sani Abacha Specialist Hospital. In 1997, the Federal Government of Nigeria renamed it Federal Medical Centre, Uyo in 1999. But was upgraded to University of Uyo Teaching Hospital in 2008. It is affiliated with University of Uyo College of Medicine all in Akwa Ibom state.

References 

Teaching hospitals in Nigeria
University of Uyo
Hospitals in Akwa Ibom
Hospitals established in 1999
1999 establishments in Nigeria